Mithuna fuscivena is a moth in the subfamily Arctiinae first described by George Hampson in 1891. It is found in Sri Lanka, Borneo, Java and Sulawesi. The habitat consists of lowland areas.

References

Moths described in 1891
Lithosiini